Twelve ships of the French Navy have borne the name Thétis in honour of nereid and sea nymph Thetis:

Ships 
 , a 44-gun ship of the line
 , a 40-gun frigate
 , a 26-gun frigate
 , a 26-gun 
 , a 40-gun 
 , a 10-gun corvette
 , a 44-gun frigate
  (1868), an  armoured corvette 
  (1916), a German-built  taken from the Greek Navy at Salamis Island in 1916.
 Thétis (1920), a water tanker
  (1988), an experimental minesweeper.

See also

Notes and references

Notes

References

Bibliography 
 
 

French Navy ship names